The Week That Wasn't is a British late-night news satire television programme series started 17 May 2018 on Sky UK and revoices real news footage, literally putting words into the mouths of news figures, and features the voices and writing of Alistair McGowan, Ronni Ancona, Matt Forde, Duncan Wisbey, Jess Robinson, and Luke Kempner.

See also
That Was the Week That Was
This Is That

References

External links
  for  Sky UK

British satirical television series